Haemanthus carneus ('carneus': Latin 'flesh-coloured') is a South African bulbous geophyte in the genus Haemanthus. Despite a fairly wide distribution, it has been collected from only a few scattered sites in the Free State, KwaZulu-Natal and the Eastern Cape near Grahamstown and Somerset East, occurring between 300 m and 1200 m above sea level.

The bulbs grow in small clumps in the shelter of trees, bushes and rocks. Their tunics are more or less equal with horizontal leaf-scars. Leaves number two or three, usually flat on the ground, appearing with the flowers or following on soon. Peduncles show quite a variation in length from 100 to 200 mm long.
H. carneus was first described in 1821 by the English botanist John Bellenden Ker Gawler (1764-1842), first editor of Edward's Botanical Register.

References

The Genus Haemanthus: A Revision - Deidré Snijman (National Botanic Gardens of South Africa 1984)

External links
Haemanthus carneus
Haemanthus carneus
Australian Bulb Association

carneus
Flora of the Cape Provinces
Flora of the Free State
Flora of KwaZulu-Natal